Nikolai Kirillovich Popel (1901–1980) was a Lieutenant-General of the eighth Soviet tank corps and political commissar in the Red Army during World War II.

During the Battle of Brody in the summer of 1941, he successfully attacked the German rear, cutting off the supply lines for the 11th Panzer Division and capturing Dubno.

He is featured as a character in the 1985 Soviet film Battle of Moscow, in which he is portrayed by Valeri Yurchenko.

See also
 Battle of Brody (1941)
 Battle of Moscow (film)

References

External links
 Panzerschlacht bei Dubno-Luzk-Riwne (Russian)

1901 births
1980 deaths
People from Kherson Governorate
Communist Party of the Soviet Union members
Soviet lieutenant generals
Soviet military personnel of the Russian Civil War
Soviet military personnel of the Winter War
Soviet military personnel of World War II